The Ponte de Aljezur (Bridge of Aljezur), is a structure located over the Ribeira de Aljezur, in the civil parish of Aljezur, municipality of Aljezur, in the Portuguese district of Faro.

History
The original bridge, which was situated a few meters from the actual pedonal viaduct, was constructed sometime in the Medieval Age.

It was reconstructed between the 17th and 18th century, with its original wood was used in the fabrication of utensils and implements for agriculture and fishing.

On 4 March 1947, the bridge was damaged by a flood that destroyed the original medieval bridge: it was re-constructed sometime in the second half of the 20th century. João Carlos Castelo Branco Soares Albergaria, as part of the impact assessment study for the construction of EN120 highway crossing through Aljezur, examined the bridge in 2011 for vestiges of the old port.

Geography

The bridge is situated over the Ribeira de Aljezur, in an area located at the confluence of the Ribeira de Alfambras and Ribeira da Cerca, at the eastern lowlands of Aljezur. It is obligatory northern passage from the Algarve along the EN120 and, similarly, the principal access to the old village (including market).

The silted margins of the river, in an area  from the bridge, are important habitats for waterfowl and species. The presence of European alder (Alnus glutinosa), Poplar (Populus), Willow (Salix) and Reed bed provides a habitat for various species of Spanish pond turtle (Mauremys leprosa), Viperine water snake (Natrix maura), Mallards (Anas platyrhynchos), Muscovy ducks (Cairina moschata), Greylag goose (Anser anser), Grey wagtail (Motacilla cinerea) and the Common nightingale (Luscinia megarhynchos). Along the banks are various aromatic plants, such as Rosemary, Lavender and Mint. To the east stretches a fertile floodplain, used for cultivating sweet potato and corn, and as pasturelands for dairy cattle. Downstream are vestiges of the ancient fluvial port with mooring posts, and a cisterns that was situated near the (now disappeared) inn and tollhouse. To the west of the bridge, near the entrance to the south, is the old village grocery, while to the east (and few meters away) is the municipal market.

Architecture
It is a three arch structure, of equal dimensions, over two rectangular pillars linked and leveled to the roadway.

The bridge is constructed of masonry, plastered and whitewashed with exposed stone along its arches, while the guards with pilasters, painted grey. The asphalt roadway is lined by pedestrian walkways in Portuguese pavement stone, and industrial tile. To the extreme west the road curves to the north, bypassing a small courtyard and palm tree, with an identical guardrail that delimit the left bank of the river.

References

Notes

Sources
 
 

Ponte Aljezur
Aljezur